Seeing Eye Dogs Australia (SEDA) is the only national organisation in Australia to focus on providing Seeing Eye Dogs to people with vision impairment.

SEDA's head office is based in Melbourne, Australia - though it has major operations in Queensland.

External links
Seeing Eye Dogs Australia

Blindness organisations in Australia
Guide dogs